Hasan Halili was the minister of agriculture in the 1992 government of Sali Berisha in Albania. He is a member of the Democratic Party.

References 

Possibly living people
Year of birth missing
Democratic Party of Albania politicians
Government ministers of Albania
Agriculture ministers of Albania